"I Want My Goodbye Back" is a song written by Pat Bunch, Doug Johnson and Dave Berg, and recorded by American country music artist Ty Herndon. It was released in June 1995 as the second single from his debut album, What Mattered Most. The song reached number 7 on the Billboard Hot Country Singles & Tracks chart in September 1995.

Critical reception
Michael McCall of New Country wrote that the song "displays his humor and energy".

Personnel
From What Mattered Most liner notes.

 Joe Chemay - bass guitar
 Dan Dugmore - steel guitar
 Rob Hajacos - fiddle
 Paul Leim - drums
 Steve Nathan - keyboards
 Brent Rowan - electric guitar
 Ron Wallace - background vocals
 Biff Watson - acoustic guitar

Music video
The music video was directed by Steven Goldmann and premiered in June 1995.

Chart performance
"I Want My Goodbye Back" debuted at number 66 on the U.S. Billboard Hot Country Singles & Tracks for the week of June 10, 1995.

Year-end charts

References

1995 singles
1995 songs
Ty Herndon songs
Songs written by Dave Berg (songwriter)
Epic Records singles
Music videos directed by Steven Goldmann
Songs written by Pat Bunch
Songs written by Doug Johnson (record producer)
Song recordings produced by Doug Johnson (record producer)